IVECO Bus (formerly Irisbus) is a bus manufacturer with headquarters in Turin. IVECO Bus is now only a brand division of IVECO which is a company incorporated under Dutch law and listed on Borsa Italiana.

History

IVECO (1975 - 1999)
In 1975 Fiat Bus created the brand IVECO (Industrial Vehicle Corporation) which gradually was recognized by Officine Meccaniche (OM), Orlandi in Italy Berliet, Renault, Chausson, Saviem in France, Karosa in the Czech Republic, Magirus-Deutz in Germany e Pegaso in Spain with the integration of Renault Bus in 1999 became later Irisbus.

Irisbus (1999 - 2013)
The French-Italian company was created in January 1999 by the merger of the coach and bus divisions of Renault Véhicules Industriels and the bus and coach divisions of Fiat Industrial and IVECO with Ikarus Bus added in late 1999. The Ikarus Bus division was sold off in 2006 to Hungary's Műszertechnika Group acquiring the property of Heuliez and Karosa which was transformed in Iveco Czech Republic in 2007.

From 2003 to 2010, Irisbus was 100%-owned by Fiat Group's IVECO, and the company was named Irisbus IVECO.
On 14 September 2011, Fiat Industrial announced the closing of the Italian plant in Flumeri, Campania due to a drastic reduction in production, preparing the relocation of the activities to Annonay France. Since 2013, Irisbus has been 100% owned by CNH Industrial's IVECO.

IVECO Bus (2013 to present)
The Irisbus name was retired and the division is a branch of Iveco, rebranded as IVECO Bus in May 2013, after a reorganization plan. All the new buses are sold under the IVECO brand, as are all the other vehicles produced by the group. The bus operator are bounded towards the criteria of purchase price, operating cost and profitability, therefore the manufacturers reduce to only few models of urban, intercity and coach buses but with many combinations in length, capacity and engine types.

The company is based in Turin with offices in Lyon, Watford, and Mainz. Buses are developed in one of two Research and Development centres, one in Italy and one in Switzerland. The engine which powers IVECO Bus Buses was developed in Italy by Fiat Powertrain Technologies.

Factories 
The main assembly plants are located in:

 Suzzara, Italy (all IVECO vehicles based on Daily)
 Vysoké Mýto, Czech Republic (ex Karosa factory)
 Annonay, France

Twenty-seven plants located in 16 countries around the world produce vehicles, supply engines and parts:

 Astra Arad, Arad, Romania
 Brescia, Italy
 Sofim, Foggia, Italy
 SPA Torino, Turin, Italy
 Valladolid, Spain
 Vénissieux, France
 Rorthais, Deux-Sèvres, France
 Changzhou, People's Republic of China
 Mumbai, India
 Minas Gerais, Brazil
 Córdoba, Argentina
 Transgór, Mysłowice, Poland
 Irex, Sosnowiec, Poland
 Senai, Malaysia
 Santarosa Motor Works, Santa Rosa, Laguna, Philippines 
 IVECO South Africa, Rosslyn, Gauteng, South Africa

Models

Current 

Urban
 Crealis Neo
 E-Way
 Crossway LE City
 Streetway
 Metro (Australian market)
 Urbanway

Intercity
 Afriway (African market)
 Crossway
 Crossway LE

Coach
 Evadys
 Magelys 

Minibus
 EcoDaily

Discontinued 

Buses
 315 (1978-2001)
 316 (1978-200)
 370 (1976-2001)
 Agora (1999-2006)
 Ares (1999-2006)
 Arway (2006-2013)
 Axer (2001-2007)
 Citelis (2005-2013)
 CityClass (1996-2008)
 DownTown (1998-2000)
 Effeuno (1984-1990)
 EuroClass (1999-2007)
 Hynovis (2008-2012)
 Midys (2004-2008)
 MyWay (1999-2007)
 Récréo (1996-2007)
 TurboCity (1989-1996)
 TurboCity R (1992-1998)

Coaches
 Domino (1998-2011)
 Evadys (2005-2013) 
 EuroRider (1997-?)
 Flipper (2006-?)
 Iliade (1997-2006)
 Midway (2004-2013)
 Proxys (2005-2013)

Minibuses
 316 (1978-2000)
 Europolis (1999-2010)
 Happy (?-?)
 Midirider (?-?)
 Proway (2005-2013)

Trolleybuses
 Agora (1999-2006)
 Civis (2004-2010)
 Cristalis (2004-2011)

Gallery

See also
 List of buses

References

External links 
 

Iveco
Bus manufacturers of France
Electric vehicle manufacturers of France
Trolleybus manufacturers
Manufacturing companies based in Lyon
Hybrid electric bus manufacturers
French subsidiaries of foreign companies
Bus manufacturers of Italy